Sexual stimulation is any stimulus (including bodily contact) that leads to, enhances and maintains sexual arousal, and may lead to orgasm. Although sexual arousal may arise without physical stimulation, achieving orgasm usually requires physical sexual stimulation.

The term sexual stimulation often implies stimulation of the genitals, but may also include stimulation of other areas of the body, stimulation of the senses (such as sight or hearing) and mental stimulation (i.e. from reading or fantasizing). Sufficient stimulation of the penis or clitoris usually results in an orgasm. Stimulation can be by self (e.g., masturbation) or by a sexual partner (sexual intercourse or other sexual activity), by use of objects or tools, or by some combination of these methods.

Some people practice orgasm control, whereby a person or their sexual partner controls the level of sexual stimulation to delay orgasm, and to prolong the sexual experience leading up to orgasm.

Physical sexual stimulation

Genital
Physical sexual stimulation usually consists of touching the genitals or other erogenous zones. Masturbation, erotic massage, sexual intercourse, a handjob or fingering are types of physical sexual stimulation involving the genitals. Sexual arousal is usually triggered through sensitive nerves in these body parts, which cause the release of pleasure-causing chemicals (endorphins) that act as mental rewards to pursue such stimulation. A person may also become sexually aroused by touching another person's genitals or other body parts. The bulbocavernosus reflex is triggered by stimulation of the glans penis or clitoris.

The purpose of sex toys is to provide pleasure and stimulation through an alternative route than just using people's bodies. They can be used by someone on their own, with partnered sex, or group sex. They can be exciting and provide new types of stimulation that the body cannot produce, such as vibrations.

Sex toys have been used as a source of sexual stimulation for thousands of years. There have been dildos found from the Palaeolithic era, made of Siltstone and polished to a high gloss. Dildos were also made of camel dung and coated with resin. Historians are uncertain whether these have been used for religious rituals or for personal pleasure. It is known that dildos were used for fertility rituals, however. The Ancient Greeks created their dildos from a carved penis covered in leather or animal intestines to create a more natural feel. The Romans created double-ended dildos for use with a partner. Ancient Chinese dildos were made of bronze or other metals and some were hollow allowing them to be filled with liquid to simulate an ejaculation. These were used because wealthy Chinese men would often have too many wives to please. In Persia, it was thought that the blood of the hymen was unclean, and should be avoided by husbands. On the night before a lady's wedding, a local holy-man would come and break her hymen with a large stone dildo, a ritual also used to confirm the virginity of the bride.

Non-genital stimulation 
There are many areas through which a person can be sexually stimulated, other than the genitals. The nipples, thighs, lips, and neck can all provide sexual stimulation when touched. 

 Nipples
 One study administered a questionnaire about sexual activity to 301 participants and found that 81.5% of women reported that stimulating their nipples caused or enhanced sexual arousal and that 59.1% of them asked to have their nipples stimulated during sex. Furthermore, 51.7% of men reported that nipple stimulation caused sexual arousal, and 39% said that it enhanced their existing arousal. Research using brain-scanning technology found that stimulating nipples in women resulted in the activation of the genital area of the sensory cortex. The research suggests the sensations are genital orgasms caused by nipple stimulation, and may also be directly linked to "the genital area of the brain". In women, one study indicated that sensation from the nipples travels to the same part of the brain as sensations from the vagina, clitoris and cervix. Nipple stimulation may trigger uterine contractions, which then produce a sensation in the genital area of the brain.
 Thighs
 In 2012, the California Institute of Technology measured brain responses in heterosexual males as they were having their inner thighs touched whilst being MRI scanned. They were either watching a video of a woman touching their thigh or a man touching their thigh. They reported more sexual pleasure when they thought it was the woman touching them than the man, and this was reflected in their MRI scans with greater arousal of their somatosensory cortex. It can be therefore concluded that the thighs are an area that can cause sexual stimulation when touched.
 Lips
 Lips contain a huge number of nerve endings and are considered to be an erogenous zone. Men report experiencing more pleasure from the stimulation of their lips than women do (see below for sex differences in stimulation). In addition to stimulation of the lips by touching, men can be visually stimulated by looking at a woman's lips. It has also been reported that men prefer women with fuller lips because they are an indicator of youth.
 Neck
 A sample of 800 participants rated 41 different body parts on their erogenous intensity on a scale of 1-10 (10 being the most arousing). Females reported neck stimulation as being more arousing than men did.

Sex differences in erogenous zones 
This table shows the sex differences in erogenous zones and includes the top ten most arousing areas for both sexes. Each body part was rated out of ten for how arousing it is when touched. Apart from body parts exclusive to one gender such as the penis or clitoris, many of the erogenous zones are similar and contain many nerve endings.

Internal stimulation: excitation-transfer theory of sexual arousal 
The excitation-transfer theory states that existing arousal in the body can be transformed into another type of arousal. For example, sometimes people can be sexually stimulated from residual arousal arising from something such as exercise, being transformed into another type of arousal such as sexual arousal. In one study participants performed some physical exercise and at different stages of recovery had to watch an erotic film and rate how aroused it made them feel. They found that participants who were still experiencing excitatory residues from the exercise rated the film as more arousing than those who had fully recovered from the exercise. This suggests that the remaining arousal from the exercise was being transformed into sexual arousal without any external stimulation.

Alternative routes 
The human sexual response is a dynamic combination of cognitive, emotional, and physiological processes. Whilst the most common forms of sexual stimulation discussed are fantasy or physical stimulation of the genitals and other erogenous areas, sexual arousal may also be mediated through alternative routes such as visual, olfactory and auditory means.

Visual 
Perhaps the most researched non-tactile form of sexual stimulation is visual sexual stimulation. An apparent example is the act of voyeurism – a practice where an individual covertly watches another undress or engage in sexual behaviour. Although seen socio-historically as an unacceptable form of 'sexual deviation', it highlights the human tendency to find sexual stimulation through purely visual routes. The multibillion-dollar industry that is pornography is another example. A common presumption in society and the media is that men respond more strongly to visual sexual stimuli than do women. This is perhaps best exemplified by the Kinsey hypothesis that men are more prone to sexual arousal from visual stimulation than women and, arguably, can be seen depicted through the "male gaze" that dominates the pornography industry. Nonetheless, both sexes can be sexually aroused through visual stimulation. In one study, visual stimulation was tested by means of an erotic video. Although significantly higher in the male group, sexual arousal was the main emotional reaction reported by both sexes. Their physiological responses to the video also showed characteristics of sexual arousal, such as increased urinary excretions of adrenaline. A subsequent study investigating male arousal showed that men were able to achieve rigid erections through visual stimulation of an erotic film alone.

Studies that use visual stimulation as a means for sexual stimulation find that sexual arousal is predominantly correlated with an activation in limbic and paralimbic cortex and in subcortical structures, along with a deactivation in several parts of the temporal cortex. These same areas are activated during physical sexual stimulation, highlighting how powerful visual stimulation can be as a means of sexual arousal.

Olfactory 
Olfactory information is critical to human sexual behavior. One study investigating olfactory sexual stimulation found that heterosexual men experience sexual arousal in response to a female perfume. Individuals rated odourant stimulation and perceived sexual arousal. They also had functional MRI scans taken during the experiment. The results showed that olfactory stimulation with women's perfume produces activation of specific brain areas associated with sexual arousal in men. Another study found that homosexual men displayed similar hypothalamic activation to that of heterosexual women when smelling a testosterone derivate present in male sweat, suggesting that sexual orientation plays a role in how humans experience olfactory sexual stimulation.

Evolutionary analysis of sex differences in reproductive strategies can help explain the importance of smell in sexual arousal due to its link to immunological profile and offspring viability. This is because olfactory cues may be able to trigger an incest avoidance mechanism by reflecting parts of an individual's genetic equipment. In one study, males rated visual and olfactory information as being equally important for selecting a lover, while females considered olfactory information to be the single most important variable in mate choice. Additionally, when considering sexual activity, females singled out body odour from all other sensory experiences as most able to negatively affect desire.

Auditory 
Auditory stimulants may also serve to intensify sexual arousal and the experience of pleasure. Making sounds during sexual arousal and sexual activity is widespread among primates and humans. These include sighs, moans, strong expirations and inspirations, increased breathing rate and occasionally, at orgasm, screams of ecstasy. Many of these sounds are highly exciting to men and women, and act as strong reinforcers of sexual arousal, creating a powerful positive feedback effect. Thus, copulatory vocalisations are likely to serve mutual sexual stimulation for mating partners.

Even when not coupled with "touching", sounds can be highly sexually arousing. Commercial erotic material (mainly produced for the male market) uses such sounds extensively. As early as the 1920s and 30s, several genres of singers turned to "low moans" for erotic effect. Vaudeville Jazz singers often incorporated sex sounds into the narrative of the lyrics. Even contemporary music such as Prince's "Orgasm" or Marvin Gaye's "You Sure Love to Ball" includes sounds of the female orgasm. Research has shown music to be an auditory sexual stimulant. In one mood induction study, exposure to certain music resulted in significantly greater penile tumescence and subjective sexual arousal for men. In a similar experiment, women did not show significant physiological responses to certain types of music but did report higher levels of sexual arousal. Further studies have looked at the connection between auditory stimulation and the experience of sexual pleasure. Whilst the highest levels of physiological and subjective arousal were found for visual stimuli, spoken-text was found to elicit sexual arousal in men, implicating sounds as a means of sexual stimulation. Phone sex is one type of arousal inducer that makes use of this effect.

Mental stimulation 
Sexual arousal includes feelings, attractions and desires, as well as physiological changes. These can be elicited not only by physical but also mental stimulations, such as fantasy, erotic literature, dreams, role-play, and imagination.

Fantasy 
Sexual fantasy is a form of mental sexual stimulation which many people engage in. It is where a person imagines a sexual experience while they are awake. Fantasy has less social or safety limits than in real life situations. It gives people more freedom to experiment or think of things they could not necessarily try in real life and can be anything from imagining your spouse naked, to imagining a sexual experience with a mythical creature. Common sexual fantasies include imagining activities with a loved partner, reliving past experiences and experiences with multiple partners of the opposite gender. It's also common to have fantasies about things you would not do in real life and about taboo or illegal activities, such as forcing another, or being forced by another to have sex, intercourse with a stranger and sex with a boy or girl or older partner.

It is useful for research because it makes differences between male and female heterosexual preferences clearer than studies of behaviour. Many sexual fantasies are shared between men and women, possibly because of cultural influence. However, there are still gender differences that have been found. Men are more likely than women to imagine being in a dominant or active role, whereas women are more likely to imagine themselves as passive participants. Women's fantasies have significantly more affection and commitment, whereas men are more likely to fantasise using visual imagery and explicit detail. One explanation of this difference comes from the evolutionary perspective. Women have a higher minimum parental investment than males (they have 9 months of gestation prior birth and are then the main care givers, whereas men only have to provide sperm to ensure their genes are passed on) and are therefore more likely to want commitment from their partner in order to gain resources to improve their offspring's chance of survival.

Fantasies can have benefits, such as increasing arousal more than other forms of sexual stimuli (such as an erotic story) and increasing sexual desire. Individuals who disclose their sexual fantasies to their partners also have a higher sexual satisfaction. However, whether people are willing to open up to their partner generally depends on the content of such fantasies. A more negative effect of sexual fantasy is that it has been linked with sexual crimes, and indeed sexual offenders often report that they have had fantasies related to their offense. However, such fantasies are also common among those who have not been involved in such criminal acts and non-offenders do not use their fantasies to guide their behaviour. Therefore, fantasy alone cannot be used as a sign that someone will become an offender.

Dreams 
Nocturnal emission orgasms or "wet dreams" are when men and women ejaculate or orgasm during sleep. These occur during REM (rapid eye movement) phases of sleep, which is the main stage when humans dream. This implies that erotic dreams alone are enough to stimulate men, however erections accompany all REM phases. According to self-report data, as many as 22% of young women may also experience orgasm during sleep, with such dreams being more common in college students in higher school years than younger students. The orgasms experienced were positively correlated with high emotionality, including sexual excitement, but also anxiety.

Sexual role-play 
Sexual role-play is when people act out characters or scenarios which may sexually stimulate each other. This can include fantasies (discussed above) and fetishes, such as BDSM (bondage and discipline, dominance and submission, sadism and masochism) or age-play. It has been described by some as an adult form of L.A.R.P (live action role-play). Role-play can also be carried out online, by typing stories to each other or pretending to be a character, and is therefore a form of mental stimulation you can engage in with another person without them being physically present. Many adolescents find online role-play pleasurable and arousing.

Role-play can also include sexual fanfiction, where characters from well-known stories, that were not sexually or romantically together in the original story, are written into sexual scenes. Slash fiction is a type of fan fiction where the characters of the same sex (originally male-male) engage in romantic or sexual activities. Slash fiction allows people the freedom to share stimulating things that can be counter-cultural.

See also
 Stimulation of the clitoral hood
 Ejaculation
 Neuroanatomy of intimacy

References

Further reading 

Sexology
Human sexuality